In Multiprotocol Label Switching (MPLS), a P router or provider router is a label switch router (LSR) that functions as a transit router of the core network. The P router is typically connected to one or more PE routers.

Here's one scenario: A customer who has facilities in LA and Atlanta wants to connect these sites over an MPLS VPN provided by AT&T. To do this, the customer would purchase a link from the on-site CE router to the PE router in AT&T's central office in LA and would also do the same thing in Atlanta. The PE routers would connect over AT&T's backbone routers (P routers) to enable the two CE routers in LA and Atlanta to communicate over the MPLS network.

See also
 Customer edge router
 Provider edge router

References 

MPLS networking